Robert Clavering (1676 – 21 July 1747) was an English bishop and Hebraist.

Life
He graduated B.A. from the University of Edinburgh, and then went to Lincoln College, Oxford. He was Fellow and tutor of University College, in 1701. In 1714 he was rector of Bocking, Essex. In 1715 he became Regius Professor of Hebrew and canon of Christ Church, Oxford.

He became rector of Marsh Gibbon in 1719. He was Bishop of Llandaff from 1724 to 1729, and then Bishop of Peterborough from 1729 to his death.

Works
At Oxford he published a translation of selections from the Mishneh Torah of
Maimonides: "Yad," "Hilkot Talmud Torah" and "Teshubah" (1705).

Notes

1676 births
1747 deaths
Alumni of the University of Edinburgh
Alumni of Lincoln College, Oxford
Fellows of University College, Oxford
Bishops of Llandaff
Bishops of Peterborough
Deans of Hereford
Christian Hebraists
18th-century Church of England bishops
Regius Professors of Hebrew (University of Oxford)
Deans of Bocking
18th-century Welsh Anglican bishops
17th-century Anglican theologians
18th-century Anglican theologians